The Massive Crush is the fifth album by the South Korean thrash metal band Crash, released in 2003.
The song "Dignity" is known because appears in Pump It Up dance games series as a selectable song to dance.

Track listing
 "Whirlwind Struggle" – 4:23
 "비아(非我)" – 3:48
 "Psychedelic Storm" – 3:54
 "Discipline" – 2:58
 "Moss (Dead Water Love)" – 4:56
 "어떤이의 꿈" (Spring, Summer, Autumn And Fall (봄여름가을겨울) Cover) - 3:34
 "Breath Form Another" – 4:34
 "Acid Rain" (Dirty Rotten Imbeciles Cover) – 3:41
 "Dignity" – 2:35
 "무상(無想)" – 4:47
 "Vaporousness" (Instrumental) – 1:39
 "니가 진짜로 원하는게 뭐야" (Shin Hae Chul Cover) – 4:28
 "Turn To Dust" - 4:13
 "이빨" – 4:20

Crash (South Korean band) albums
2003 albums
Industrial metal albums